PortAudio is an open-source computer library for audio playback and recording. It is a cross-platform library, so programs using it can run on many different computer operating systems, including Windows, Mac OS X and Linux. PortAudio supports Core Audio, ALSA, and MME, DirectSound, ASIO and WASAPI on Windows. Like other libraries whose primary goal is portability, PortAudio is written in the C programming language. It has also been implemented in the languages PureBasic and Lazarus/Free Pascal. PortAudio is based on a callback paradigm, similar to JACK and ASIO.

PortAudio is part of the PortMedia project, which aims to provide a set of platform-independent libraries for music software. The free audio editor Audacity uses the PortAudio library, and so does JACK on the Windows platform.

See also 

 List of free software for audio

Notes

References 

 PortAudio: Portable Audio Processing for All Platforms
 Using portable, multi-OS sound systems

External links 

 

Audio libraries
Computer libraries
Free software programmed in C
Software using the MIT license